The 1972 Montana Grizzlies football team was an American football team that represented the University of Montana in the Big Sky Conference during the 1972 NCAA College Division football season. In their sixth year under head coach Jack Swarthout, the Grizzlies played their home games at Dornblaser Field and compiled a 3–8 record, (3–3 in Big Sky, third).

Schedule

References

Montana
Montana Grizzlies football seasons
Montana Grizzlies football